Armenia Dam is a dam in the Leeu River, near Hobhouse, Free State province, South Africa. It was established in 1954.

See also
List of reservoirs and dams in South Africa
List of rivers in South Africa

References 
 List of South African Dams from the South African Department of Water Affairs

Dams in South Africa
Dams completed in 1954